Mimosine or leucenol is a toxic non-protein amino acid chemically similar to tyrosine. It occurs in some Mimosa spp. (including M. pudica) and all members of the closely related genus Leucaena.

This compound, also known as leucenol, was first isolated from the seeds of Leucaena glauca Benth., and was later investigated by Adams and coworkers.

Properties
Mimosine melts with decomposition. The hydrochloride salt melts at 174.5–175.0 °C with decomposition; the hydrobromide decomposes at 179.5 °C, and the hydroiodide decomposes at 183–183.5 °C. Mimosine only forms monobasic acids, but the methyl ester forms a dihydrochloride, C7H9O2N2(COOMe)•2 HCl•½ H2O, mp. 175–6 °C.

Biological effects
Mimosine arrests dividing cells in the late G1 phase by inhibiting DNA replication initiation. In ruminants, mimosine is degraded to 3,4- and 2,3-dihydroxypyridone (3,4- and 2,3-DHP).

Although toxicosis has occurred in Australia, Papua New Guinea, Africa and Florida, it has not been recorded in any other tropical and subtropical regions. Goats in Burma lost hair when fed a diet containing 50% of Leucaena. Goats and cattle in Hawaii are able to degrade the 3,4-DHP ruminally. Tolerance might be related to the presence or absence of microbes tolerant to mimosine and 3,4-DHP. It is known that at least Australian goats do not share the abilities of their Hawaiian counterparts.

Bickel and Wibaut found in feeding experiments with rats and mice that leucenol is probably the toxic constituent of Leucaena glauca seeds, but they did not observe with these animals the loss of hair that seems to occur when these seeds are fed to cattle. Aung from Myanmar isolated the new subspecies of Klebsiella pneumoniae that can degrade mimosine. Besides, Moe Thida Htun, from Myanmar also found another new sub-species of Baccilus aureus that can degrade mimosine. 

Some rhizobia are known to produce rhizomimosinase, which consumes pyridoxal 5′-phosphate to degrade mimosine into 3,4 dihydroxypyridine, pyruvate, and ammonium. A similar enzyme, mimosinase, is produced by Leucaena leucocephala.

See also 
Hordenine
Meteloidine

References

Amino acids
4-Pyridones
Plant toxins
Toxic amino acids